A hypersaline lake is a landlocked body of water that contains significant concentrations of sodium chloride, brines, and other salts, with saline levels surpassing that of ocean water (3.5%, i.e. ). 

Specific microbial species can thrive in high-salinity environments that are inhospitable to most lifeforms, including some that are thought to contribute to the colour of pink lakes. Some of these species enter a dormant state when desiccated, and some species are thought to survive for over 250 million years.

The water of hypersaline lakes has great buoyancy due to its high salt content.

Hypersaline lakes are found on every continent, especially in arid or semi-arid regions.

In the Arctic, the Canadian Devon Ice Cap contains two subglacial lakes that are hypersaline. In Antarctica, there are larger hypersaline water bodies, lakes in the McMurdo Dry Valleys such as Lake Vanda with salinity of over 35% (i.e. 10 times as salty as ocean water).

The most saline water body in the world is the Gaet'ale Pond, located in the Danakil Depression in Afar, Ethiopia. The water of Gaet'ale Pond has a salinity of 43%, making it the saltiest water body on Earth (i.e. 12 times as salty as ocean water). Previously, it was considered that the most saline lake outside of Antarctica was Lake Assal, in Djibouti, which has a salinity of 34.8% (i.e. 10 times as salty as ocean water). Probably the best-known hypersaline lakes are the Dead Sea (34.2% salinity in 2010) and the Great Salt Lake in the state of Utah, US (5–27% variable salinity). The Dead Sea, dividing Israel and the West Bank from Jordan, is the world's deepest hypersaline lake. The Great Salt Lake, while having nearly three times the surface area of the Dead Sea, is shallower and experiences much greater fluctuations in salinity. At its lowest recorded water levels, it approaches 7.7 times the salinity of ocean water, but when its levels are high, its salinity drops to only slightly higher than that of the ocean.

See also
 
 
 Halophile – organism that thrives in high salt concentrations
 List of bodies of water by salinity
 Pink lake 
 Salt lake – one with a concentration of salts and minerals significantly higher than most lakes

References

Hydrology